Regional Council elections were held in Réunion on 20 February 1983. The Rally for the Republic–Union for French Democracy–Departmentalist Militant Front alliance emerged as the largest in the Council, winning 18 of the 45 seats.

Results

Aftermath
Following the elections, the President of the Regional Council was elected by the Council on 28 February. Mario Hoarau of the Communist Party of Réunion was elected in the third ballot.

References

Reunion
Reunion
Elections in Réunion
1983 in Réunion